The 1910 Penkala Biplane also called the Leptir was the first aircraft to fly in Croatia.

Design and development
The Leptir was a single engine, sesquiplane aircraft with conventional landing gear. The open girder fuselage provides an unusually long distance to the tail surfaces, compared to modern aircraft. The flat bottom surface of the fuselage was covered, forming a long thin triangular surface intended to provide lift, which was not functional in level flight. The aircraft was tail heavy with a center of gravity at 70 percent of wing chord.

Operational history
The first flight occurred on 22 June 1910 with pilot Dragutin Novak. The aircraft was crashed several months later.

Variants
1910 Biplane
Original design
1910 Leptir II 
Modifications to include skids
2010 CA-10 Replica
Replica aircraft - Powered by  Rotax 912 with the center of gravity moved forward for safety.

Specifications (Penkala Biplane)

References

External links
YouTube Video about the flight of the replica
Article about the aircraft
Image of Leptir I  DEAD LINK

Single-engined tractor aircraft
Sesquiplanes
1910 in Croatia
Aircraft first flown in 1910
Conventional landing gear